Arhopala johoreana is a butterfly in the family Lycaenidae. It was described by Alexander Steven Corbet in 1941. It is found in Malaysia and on Nias.

Subspecies
Arhopala johoreana johoreana (Malaysia)
Arhopala johoreana kalima Evans, 1957 (Nias)

References

Arhopala
Butterflies described in 1941
Butterflies of Asia